A white horse is a horse born white that stays white throughout its life.

White Horse, or variants, may also refer to:

Colouring of horses 
 Dominant white, a group of genetically-related horse coat color conditions
 Gray horse, a horse with a coat color characterized by progressive depigmentation of coat hairs
 Sabino horse, a horse with a group of white spotting patterns
 Pinto horse, a horse with a coat color that consists of large patches of white and any other color

Mythology and symbolism 
 White horses in mythology
 White Horse of Hanover, an emblem of the Royal House of Hanover
 White Horse of Kent, a symbol of the English county of Kent

People 
 White Horse (Kiowa leader) (died 1892), chief of the Kiowa nation
 Logan Fontenelle (1825–1855), also known as Shon-ga-ska (White Horse), an interpreter in Omaha negotiations with the United States

Places

United States
 White Horse, California
 White Horse, New Jersey
 White Horse, Bucks County, Pennsylvania
 White Horse, Lancaster County, Pennsylvania
 White Horse, South Dakota, in Todd County
 White Horse Historic District, or White Horse Village, in Willistown Township, Chester County, Pennsylvania

Other countries
 White Horse Bluff, a volcano in British Columbia, Canada
 White Horse Bridge, in Wembley, England
 White Horse Stone, two megaliths near Aylesford, Kent, England
 White Horse Temple, the first Buddhist temple in China
 Vale of White Horse, a local government district in Oxfordshire, England

Hill figures

England
 Alton Barnes White Horse, in Wiltshire
 Broad Town White Horse, in Wiltshire
 Cherhill White Horse, in Wiltshire
 Devizes White Horse, in Wiltshire
 Folkestone White Horse, in Kent
 Hackpen White Horse, in Wiltshire
 Kilburn White Horse, in North Yorkshire
 Litlington White Horse, in East Sussex
 Marlborough White Horse, in Wiltshire
 Osmington White Horse, in Dorset
 Pewsey White Horse, in Wiltshire
 Tan Hill White Horse, in Wiltshire
 Uffington White Horse, in Oxfordshire
 Westbury White Horse, or Bratton White Horse, in Wiltshire
 Woolbury White Horse, in Hampshire

New Zealand
 White Horse Monument, in Waimate, New Zealand

Pubs, inns and taverns
 The White Horse, Burnham Green, Hertfordshire, England
 The White Horse, Enfield, London, England
 The White Horse, Hertford, Hertfordshire, England
 The White Horse, Potters Bar, Hertfordshire, England
 White Horse Hotel (disambiguation)
 White Horse Tavern (disambiguation)
 The White Horse Inn (disambiguation)

Arts and entertainment

Film and television 
 White Horse (film), a 2008 short documentary
 The White Horse (film), a 1962 Mexican film
 The White Horse (series), a 1993 Russian TV series
 The White Horses, a 1965 Yugoslavian/German TV series,

Literature 
 The White Horse a 1758 book by Emanuel Swedenborg
 The Ballad of the White Horse, a 1911 poem by G. K. Chesterton
 When a white horse is not a horse, a paradox in Chinese philosophy in the White Horse Dialogue

Music 
 White Horse (album), by Michael Omartian, 1974
 "White Horse" (Laid Back song), 1983
 "White Horse" (Taylor Swift song), 2008
 "White Horse" (Jessica 6 song), 2011
 "White Horse", a 1996 song by Kilo Ali
 "White Horse", a 2010 song by Sarah McLeod
 "White Horse", a 2019 song by Tenille Townes from The Lemonade Stand
 "White Horses", by Jacky, the theme tune of 1965 TV series The White Horses

Other uses in arts and entertainment 
 White Horse at Ebbsfleet, a proposed gigantic sculpture in Kent, England
 The White Horse (Constable), an 1819 oil painting

Transportation 
 White Horse, a GWR 3031 Class locomotive built 1891
 White Horse Ferries, a defunct ferry company in England
 U.S. Route 30 in New Jersey, known as the White Horse Pike

Other uses
 White Horse (military), the South Korean army's 9th Infantry Division
 White Horse (whisky), a blended Scotch whisky 
 White Horse Distillery, an Irish whiskey distillery
 White Horse Prophecy, of the Latter Day Saints
 White horses, a white and foamy sea wave

See also 

Whitehorse (disambiguation)
 White Horse Mountain (disambiguation)
 White knight (disambiguation)
 Battle of White Horse, during the Korean War 
 Hill figure
 1923 FA Cup Final, known as the White Horse Final, a football match